Bernard McLaughlin may refer to:

 Bernie McLaughlin (1921–1961), Irish-American gangster
 Bernard Joseph McLaughlin (1912–2015), American Roman Catholic bishop